The Kerala Urban Road Transport Corporation (KURTC) was a state-run bus company which started with more than 500 low-floor buses (A/C & NON A/C) in Kerala. KURTC used to run complete and individual services in Thiruvananthapuram  & Ernakulam districts. The remaining 12 districts were divided into 5 clusters ; Cluster I comprises Kozhikode, Wayanad and Malappuram; Cluster II Kottayam, Thodupuzha, and Pathanamthitta; Cluster III Kannur and Kasaragod; Cluster IV Thrissur and Palakkad; and Cluster V Kollam and Alappuzha. COVID gravely affected the profitability and sustenance of this service, the buses got rusted due to non usage and only 97 were functional out of which 70 were then given to City Circular Bus service. As of today KURTC has shut down all operations and the institution is in the process of closing down. Even their official website www.kurtc.in has been closed down thus signaling the end of a golden era of cheap and convenient transport service for customers.

History
The Kerala Urban Road Transport Corporation was inaugurated in April 2015 by Oommen Chandy, the then Chief Minister of Kerala, with headquarters in Thevara in Kochi, to operate low-floor buses which are procured with the financial assistance from the Jawaharlal Nehru National Urban Renewal Mission (JNNURM). It features a separate account and logo.

Gallery

See also
 Kerala State Road Transport Corporation

References

 

</ref>
KURTC KURTC Closes Down

External links
 https://kurtc.in/
 http://www.kurtcbooking.com/

Bus companies of India
Transport in Kerala
State road transport corporations of India
State agencies of Kerala
Indian companies established in 2014
Companies based in Kochi
2014 establishments in Kerala
Government agencies established in 2014